, is a Buddhist temple belonging to the Sōtō school of Japanese Zen located in the city of Sakata, Yamagata Prefecture, Japan.   Its main image is a statue of Sho-Kannon bosatsu. The Japanese garden at this temple was designated a National Place of Scenic Beauty in 1996.

History
Sōkō-ji was founded in 1384 by Getsuan Ryoen (1348-1425), under the sponsorship of local warlord Satō Masanobu, a descendant of the famed warrior Satō Tsugunobu, who was killed at the Battle of Yashima while defending Minamoto no Yoshitsune.  The temple gate was completed in 1811. The temple served as the bodaiji of the successive daimyō of Dewa-Matsuyama Domain, a subsidiary domain of Shōnai Domain.

The temple garden was reconstructed in 1756 in the style of Kobori Enshū after most of the temple was destroyed in a fire. Also of note at the temple is a row of 120 cryptomeria trees lining the entry to the temple, which are trimmed in a form of topiary art to resemble mushrooms. These trees are over 400 years old, and are a Yamagata Prefectural Natural Monument.

The temple is located ten minutes by car from Amarume Station on the JR East Uetsu Main Line.

See also
List of Places of Scenic Beauty of Japan (Yamagata)

References

External links
Sakata City tourist information
Cultural Assets of Yamagata Prefecture

Buddhist temples in Yamagata Prefecture
Sakata, Yamagata
Soto Zen
Dewa Province